State highways in the U.S. state of Iowa are owned and maintained by the Iowa Department of Transportation.

References

 
State